Blood-Rooted is an album by Sepultura, released on June 3, 1997. It was a collection of unreleased tracks, B-sides, remixes, and live recordings. It was also the last officially recognised Sepultura album featuring original singer Max Cavalera, who left in December 1996 amid a dispute regarding the band's management. Cavalera was replaced by American singer Derrick Green in 1997.

Tracks 1–6 and 11 are cover songs.

Track listing

Credits
Martin Eric Ain – composer
Carlton "Carly" Barrett – composer
Toni Bellotto – composer
Jello Biafra – composer
Black Sabbath – composer
Scott Burns – mixing
Geezer Butler – composer
Igor Cavalera – drums, percussion, producer
Max Cavalera – guitar, photography, producer, vocals
George Chin – photography
Jonathan Davis – composer, guest artist, vocals
DJ Lethal – composer, producer
Michael Grecco – photography
Tony Iommi – composer
Paulo Junqueiro – producer
Andreas Kisser – guitar, producer
Jim Lockyer – engineer
Rob Martinez – composer
Alex Newport – mixing
Ozzy Osbourne – composer
Mike Patton – composer, guest artist, vocals
Paulo Jr. – bass, producer
Steven Remote – recording engineer
Ross Robinson – mixing, producer
Sepultura – composer, primary artist, producer
Andy Wallace – mixing, producer
Bill Ward – composer
Thomas Gabriel Warrior	– composer

References

External links
 Sepultura's official website

B-side compilation albums
Albums produced by Andy Wallace (producer)
Albums produced by Ross Robinson
1997 compilation albums
Sepultura compilation albums
Roadrunner Records compilation albums